This is a list of artists who have played at the various Fairport Convention Fairport's Cropredy Convention over the years.

Appearances since 2016 can be found in the article Fairport's Cropredy Convention.

2022
Thursday 11 August 2022
Fairport Convention Acoustic
Thumping Tommys
Edward II
Clannad
The Trevor Horn Band

Friday 12 August 2022
Maddie Morris
Emily Barker
Home Service
Martyn Joseph
Slambovian Circus of Dreams
Sharon Shannon
Turin Brakes
Steve Hackett-Genesis Revisited

Saturday 13 August 2022
Seth Lakeman
Holy Moly & The Crackers
The Bar-Steward Sons of Val Doonican
Rosalie Cunningham
Matthews Southern Comfort
Richard Thompson
Fairport Convention & Friends

2021
Cancelled due to Coronavirus Pandemic

2020
Cancelled due to Coronavirus Pandemic

2016

Thursday 11 August 2016
Fairport Acoustic Convention 
Gryphon
CoCo and the Butterfields
Hayseed Dixie
Madness

Friday 12 August 2016 
Anthony John Clarke and Dave Pegg
Brìghde Chaimbeul 
Sound of the Sirens
Lifesigns
Wille and the Bandits
Headspace
Steeleye Span
The Bootleg Beatles

Saturday 13 August 2016
Richard Digance
Maia 
Gilmore & Roberts
Pierce Brothers
The Demon Barbers XL
Babylon Circus
Ralph McTell 
Fairport Convention & Friends

2015

Thursday 13 August 2015
Fairport Acoustic Convention 
Trad Arrr
Dreadzone
Katzenjammer
Emmylou Harris and Rodney Crowell

Friday 14 August 2015 
Talisk
ahab 
Judith Owen
Skinny Lister
Skerryvore
Fish
The Proclaimers
Level 42

Saturday 15 August 2015
Richard Digance
Kevin Dempsey and Rosie Carson 
The Newgrass Cutters
Band of Friends
Toyah Willcox
Paul Carrack
Iain Matthews and Egbert Derix
Fairport Convention & Friends

2014
Thursday 7 August 2014
Fairport Acoustic Convention
Joe Broughton's Conservatoire Folk Ensemble
Capercaillie
Steve Hackett – Genesis Extended
The Waterboys

Friday 8 August 2014
The Mischa MacPherson Trio
Deborah Rose
Edwina Hayes
Benjamin Folke Thomas
Churchfitters
The Travelling Band
The Wonder Stuff
Chas & Dave
The Australian Pink Floyd Show

Saturday 9 August 2014
Richard Digance
Blackbeard's Tea Party
Reg Meuross
Treetop Flyers
Cara Dillon
Marillion
Al Stewart
Fairport Convention & Friends

2013

Thursday 8 August 2013
Fairport Acoustic Convention
Fake Thackray
Romeo's Daughter
Edward II
Alice Cooper

Friday 9 August 2013
BBC YFA Winners – Greg Russell and Ciaran Algar
Danny and the Champions of the World
Kathryn Roberts and Sean Lakeman
Moulettes
Lúnasa
Martin Barre's New Day
Levellers
10cc

Saturday 10 August 2013
Richard Digance
Mediæval Bæbes
Brooks Williams
The Dunwells
Peatbog Faeries 
Nik Kershaw
Fairport Convention & Friends

2012

Thursday 9 August 2012
Fairport Acoustic Convention
Kieran Goss
Legend
Bellowhead
Squeeze

Friday 10 August 2012
BBC YFA Winners – Ioscaid
Ellen & The Escapades
Dead Flamingoes (feat. Kami Thompson & James Walbourne)
Tarras
Larkin Poe
Saw Doctors
Richard Thompson
Joan Armatrading

Saturday 11 August 2012
Richard Digance
Morris On
Brother & Bones
Calan
Big Country as "Special Guests"
Dennis Locorriere
Fairport Convention & Friends

2011
Thursday 11 August 2011
Fairport Acoustic Convention
Katriona Gilmore & Jamie Roberts
Blair Dunlop
Home Service
Hayseed Dixie
UB40

Friday 12 August 2011
BBC YFA Winners - Moore, Moss, Rutter
The Travelling Band
Steve Tilston & The Durbervilles
Charlie Dore
The Dylan Project
The Urban Folk Quartet
The Coral
Seasick Steve

Saturday 13 August 2011
Richard Digance
The Shee
The Blockheads
Lau
Horslips as "Very Special Guests"
Badly Drawn Boy
Fairport Convention & Friends

2010
Thursday August 12
Keith Donnelly & Flossie Malavialle
Leatherat
Thea Gilmore
Pauline Black of The Selecter
Status Quo

Friday August 13
The Tindalls
Martin Taylor’s Spirit of Django
Mabon
3 Daft Monkeys
Little Johnny England
The Dixie Bee-Liners
Little Feat
Bellowhead

Saturday August 14
Richard Digance
Breabach
ahab
Easy Star All Stars
Rick Wakeman & The English Rock Ensemble
Martyn Joseph
Fairport Convention & Friends (including excerpts from the Rock Opera Excalibur)

2009
Thursday August 13
Harlequinn
4 Square
Nicol & Cool
Buzzcocks
Steve Winwood

Friday August 14
ColvinQuarmby
Megan & Joe Henwood
Scott Matthews
Ade Edmondson & The Bad Shepherds
John Jorgensen Band
The Dodge Brothers
Richard Thompson
Seth Lakeman

Saturday August 15
Richard Digance
Churchfitters
Feast of Fiddles
Dreadzone
Nik Kershaw
Ralph McTell
Fairport Convention & Friends (including special guest Yusuf)

2008
Thursday August 7
Whapweasel
Anthony John Clarke
The Gathering
John Tams and Barry Coope
Supergrass

Friday August 8
The Family Mahone
Peggy & PJ Wright
3 Daft Monkeys
Siobhan Miller & Jeana Leslie (BBC Radio 2 Young Folk Award winners)
Stackridge
Paul Brady and his band
Joe Brown and his band featuring special guest Dave Edmunds
Levellers

Saturday August 9
Richard Digance
 Lark Rise to Candleford featuring Ashley Hutchings
Legend (Bob Marley tribute)
The Muffinmen
The Julie Fowlis Band
Midge Ure
Fairport Convention & Friends (including special guest Robert Plant)

2007
40th Anniversary Year

Thursday August 9
Anthony John Clarke
Kerfuffle
Wishbone Ash
Seth Lakeman
The Jools Holland's Rhythm and Blues Orchestra

Friday August 10
Hummingbird
Mad Agnes
The Demon Barbers Roadshow
Last Orders
Viva Santana
Show of Hands
Fairport 1969 perform Liege and Lief
The Richard Thompson Band

Saturday August 11
Richard Digance
Give Way
The Bucket Boys
Iain Matthews
Strawbs
Billy Mitchell and Bob Fox
Fairport Convention & Friends

2006

Thursday August 10
 wRants
 PJ Wright
 Feast of Fiddles
 Chris Newman & Maire Ni Chathasaigh
 Steeleye Span

Friday August 11
 Shameless Quo
 Bodega (Radio 2 Young Folk Award winner)
 Then Came The Wheel
 Ashley Hutchings' Rainbow Chasers
 The Deborah Bonham Band
 Flook
 John Martyn Band
 10cc featuring Graham Gouldman and friends

Saturday August 12
 Richard Digance
 Sam Holmes
 Swarb's Lazarus
 King Pleasure and the Biscuit Boys
 Dervish
 Glenn Tilbrook
 Fairport Convention & Friends

2005
Thursday August 11
 Tickled Pink
 Simon Mayor and Hilary James
 Jah Wobble
 Country Joe McDonald and his band

Friday August 12
 Big Eyed Fish
 Bob Fox performs solo
 Stuey Mutch with Henry Nicol
 Edwina Hayes
 Chris While and Julie Matthews
 The Muffin Men with Jimmy Carl Black
 The Ukulele Orchestra of Great Britain
 Richard Thompson
 The Dylan Project

Saturday August 13
 Richard Digance
 T & Latouche
 Uiscedwr
 The Hamsters
 Beth Nielsen Chapman
 Fairport Convention & Friends

2004

Thursday 12 August
 Blue Meanies
 Mostly Autumn
 Jackie Leven and Michael Cosgrove
 Oysterband

Friday 13 August
 Earl Okin
 Andy Guttridge Band
 Family Mahone
 Anna Ryder/Steve Tilston Band with Maart Allcock and Clive Bunker
 Jerry Donahue Band
 Show of Hands
 Jethro Tull

Saturday 14 August
 Richard Digance
 Tiny Tin Lady
 The Mighty Firebirds
 Jez Lowe and The Bad Pennies
 Ashley Hutchings Morris On
 Nick Harper
 Fairport Convention & Friends

2003

Thursday 7 August
 Colvin Quarmby
 Meet on the Ledge
 Trevor Burton Band
 Lindisfarne

Friday 8 August
 Mark Gillespie
 Keith Donnelly
 Equation
 David Hughes
 Bucket Boys
 Blue Tapestry
 Procol Harum

Saturday 9 August
 Richard Digance
 Al Hodge and The Mechanics
 The Hush
 Old Blind Dogs
 Albert Lee
 Dennis Locorriere
 Paul Mitchell singing Sinatra Songbook
 Fairport Convention & Friends

2002
The 35th anniversary event.

 Thursday 8 August
 Freeway Jam
 The Joyce Gang
 The Dubliners
 e2K

 Friday 9 August
 Mundy-Turner
 Sarah Jory
 Magna Carta
 Oysterband
 Broderick
 Richard Thompson
 Fairport Convention "The Early Years"

 Saturday 10 August
 Richard Digance
 Little Johnny England
 Eddi Reader
 Deborah Bonham
 The Alison Brown Quartet
 Fairport Convention & Friends

2001
Thursday 9 August
 Tarras
 Steve Ashley & Friends
 The Dylan Project
 Lonnie Donegan

Friday 10 August
 Sandwitch
 Whirligig
 Keith Donnelly & Guests
 Chris While & Julie Matthews
 Sugarland Slim
 The Eliza Carthy Band
 Musafir
 De Dannan

Saturday 11 August
 Chuckletruck
 Vikki Clayton & Friends
 Five Furious Fish
 Francis Dunnery & The Grass Virgins
 Amos Garrett
 Brass Monkey
 Fairport Convention & Friends

2000
 Thursday 10 August
 Spank the Monkey
 Incredible String Band
 All About Eve

 Friday 11 August
 Keith Donnelly
 Little Johnny England
 Iain Matthews & Andy Roberts
 The Backroom Boys
 The Albion Band
 Priory of Brion

 Saturday 12 August
 The Unprofessionals
 Bob Fox
 Stackridge
 The Hamsters
 Show of Hands
 Fairport Convention & Friends

1999
Friday 13 August
 Blazing Homesteads
 Chris While & Julie Maththews
 Jacqui McShee's Pentangle
 Kevin Dempsey & Dave Swarbrick
 The Dylan Project
 The Richard Thompson Band
 Barrage

Saturday 14 August
 Barrage
 Anna Ryder
 The Paul Mitchell Band
 Ralph McTell
 The Robbie McIntosh Band
 Maddy Prior and Friends
 Fairport Convention and Friends

1998
Friday 14 August
 Anna Ryder
 Stringthing
 Solstice
 Vikki Clayton Band
 Fling
 Edward II
 Rory McLeod
 Roy Wood's Army

Saturday 15 August
 The Tabs
 Waz
 Cat Scratch Fever
 Rory McLeod
 Hank Wangford and the Lost Cowboys
 Loudon Wainwright III
 Fairport Convention & Friends

1997
Friday 8 August
 Pressgang
 Kristina Olsen
 The Julian Dawson Band
 Osibisa
 Fairport Convention
 The Saw Doctors

Saturday 9 August
 Tempest
 Huw and Tony Williams
 Eliza Carthy with the Kings of Calicutt
 John Otway and Wild Willy Barrett
 Fairport Convention & Friends

1996
Friday 9 August
 Superjam
 Clarion
 Chris Leslie and Beryl Marriott
 Edward II
 The Richard Thompson Band

Saturday 10 August
 Superjam
 The King Earl Boogie Band
 David Hughes and Gerry Conway
 The Atlantic Wave Band
 The Hellecasters
 Show of Hands
 Joe Brown and His Band
 Fairport Convention & Friends

1995
Friday 11 August
 Eden Burning
 The Kathryn Tickell Band
 Procol Harum

Saturday 12 August
 Waulk Elektrik
 Huw and Tony Williams
 The Poozies
 The Nerve
 Wild Willy Barrett
 The Hamsters
 Richard Thompson with Danny Thompson
 Fairport Convention & Friends: The Roy Wood Big Band.

1994
Friday 12 August
 Tower Struck Down
 Roy Harper
 Lindisfarne

Saturday 13 August
 Too Cool For Shorts
 Shave The Monkey
 Man
 Horch
 Blodwyn Pig
 The Vin Garbutt Band
 Fairport Convention & Friends

1993
Friday 13 August
 Clarion
 Richard Thompson & Danny Thompson
 The Leningrad Cowboys

Saturday 14 August
 The Buttermountain Boys
 Robin Williamson
 The Martin Barre Band
 Stockton's Wing
 Fallen Angels
 Fairport Convention & Guests

1992
Friday 14 August
 The Wright Brothers
 Richard Thompson
 Fairport Convention & Friends

Saturday 15 August
 Skin The Peeler
 The Backroom Boys
 Four Men And A Dog
 Wolfstone
 Swarbrick And Carthy
 Fairport Convention & Friends

1991
Friday 16 August
 Freeway Jam
 Eugene Wallace
 Storm
 The Richard Thompson Band

Saturday 17 August
 Blinder
 Jay Turner
 The Poor Mouth
 The Steve Gibbons Band
 Whippersnapper
 Alias Ron Kavana
 Dan Ar Braz
 Fairport Convention & Friends

1990
Friday 17 August
 Avalon
 Ralph McTell
 The Bootleg Beatles

Saturday 18 August
 The Banana Band
 Kieran Halpin
 The Julian Dawson Band
 The Albion Band
 Blues n Trouble
 The Fureys & Davey Arthur
 Richard Thompson
 Fairport Convention & Friends

1989
Friday 18 August
 The Breakers
 Zumzeaux
 Steeleye Span

Saturday 19 August
 The Elaine Morgan Band
 After Hours
 Climax Blues Band
 Sally Barker
 All About Eve
 Richard Thompson
 Fairport Convention & Friends

1988
 Friday 12 August
 Collaboration
 Mike Silver
 The Richard Thompson Band

Saturday 13 August
 The Kursaal Flyers
 Sally Barker
 Filarfolket
 The Steve Gibbons Band
 Dan Ar Bras' Electric Band
 Fairport Convention & Friends

1987

Friday 7 August
Le Rue
Gordon Giltrap
John Martyn & Danny Thompson

Saturday 8 August
The Steve Ashley Band
Mara!
Chicken Shack
Muzsikas
Whippersnapper
Richard Thompson
Fairport Convention & Friends: June Tabor, Cathy LeSurf, Ian Anderson, Martin Barre

1986

Friday 8 August
Kieran Halpin with Martin Allcock & Manus Lunny
Mike Elliott
The Richard Thompson Band

Saturday 9 August
The Electric Bluebirds
The Jon Strong Band
The Sutherland Brothers
Brass Monkey
Dick Gaughan
Fairport Convention & Friends: Ian Matthews, Robert Plant, Cathy LeSurf, Richard Thompson, Clive Gregson, Christine Collister, Mike Silver, Jerry Donahue, Bill Zorn

1985

Friday 9 August
No Right Turn
Neil Innes
Fairport Convention (Full House lineup)

Saturday 10 August
Jon Benns
John James Band with Dick Heckstall-Smith
Mosaic
Balham Alligators
Whippersnapper
The Home Service
Robin Williamson
Fairport Convention & Friends: Billy Connolly, Richard Thompson, Cathy LeSurf, Ralph McTell, Trevor Lucas, Jerry Donahue

1984

Friday 10 August
Ragged Heroes
Bob Davenport
Adrian Legg
Steeleye Span

Saturday 11 August
The Oyster Band with Cathy LeSurf
Ian Campbell
Garsters Dream Band
Allan Taylor
Pyewackett
Ian Campbell
Whippersnapper
The Battlefield Band
Richard Digance
Fairport Convention & Friends: Cathy LeSurf, Wally Whyton, Matt Pegg, Ian & Lorna Campbell, Bob Davenport

1983

Friday 12 August
Easvesdropper
Jon Benns
Richard Thompson Big Band

Saturday 13 August
Blowzabella
Jon Benns
Eclipse
Carrig
Arizona Smoke Review
Maxi & Mitch
Albion Band
Vin Garbutt
Fairport Convention & Friends: Cathy LeSurf, Dave Mattacks, Ashley Hutchings, Richard Thompson, Paul Mitchell (harmonica), Linda Thompson, Alastair Anderson, Andy (of the Marksmen), Dave Whetstone

1982

Friday 13 August
Knacker's Yard
Dan Ar Bras
Fairport Convention Performing "Babbacombe Lee"
The Home Service

Saturday 14 August
Captains Coco's Country Dance Band
Bob Fox and Stu Luckley
Dan Ar Bras
Professor Bruce Lacey
Maddy Prior Band
Fairport Convention & Friends: Trevor Lucas, Jerry Donahue, Dave Mattacks, Linda Thompson

1981
Note: this festival was held at Broughton Castle.

Friday 14 August
The Sussex Trug Band
Simon & Andrew Loake
Ralph McTell, Richard Thompson, Dave Pegg & Dave Mattacks - The GPs

Saturday 15 August
Captains Coco's Country Dance Band
Steve Ashley & Chris Leslie
Earl Okin
The Bert Jansch Group
Martin Carthy & John Kirkpatrick
Fairport Convention & Friends: Richard Thompson, Judy Dyble

1980
Note: this was the first official Reunion Festival.

Friday 30 August
Captains Coco's Country Dance Band
John Kirkpatrick and Sue Harris
Richard & Linda Thompson
Fairport Convention & Friends: Ralph McTell, Richard Thompson, Linda Thompson, Dave Mattacks, Robert Jordan

1979
Note: this was the official "Farewell" concert.

Saturday 4 August
Bag O'Nails
The Kitchen Band
The Rollright Stones
Graham Smiths Greek Section
The Tanglefoot Band
Simon & Andrew Loake
Steve Ashley & Chris Leslie
Earl Okin
Tony O'Leary
Fairport Convention with special guest: Ralph McTell

1976 to 1978

The first Fairport Convention concert held in Cropredy was in the back garden of a friend's house, on Saturday 17 July 1976. Although it was a private concert, there was an attendance of 750. It then became established as an annual event; from 1977, tickets were sold; in 1978, a larger site was used.

Notes

References

Music festivals in Oxfordshire